The Península de Almina is a peninsula making up much of the eastern part of the Spanish city of Ceuta in Africa. It is dominated by the peak of Monte Hacho. The peninsula contains Ceuta's easternmost point, Punta Almina, and is connected to the rest of Ceuta by an isthmus barely  in width.

The small Isla de Santa Catalina lies off the peninsula's north coast.

References

Landforms of Ceuta
Peninsulas of Spain